The 1978 2. divisjon was a Norwegian second-tier football league season.

The league was contested by 30 teams, divided into a total of three groups; A and B (non-Northern Norwegian teams) and Group C, a district group which contained teams from Northern Norway. The winners of group A and B were promoted to the 1979 1. divisjon. The second placed teams in group A and B met the winner of group C in a qualification round where the winner was promoted to 1. divisjon. The bottom team in group A and B and the seven lowest ranked teams in group C were relegated to the 3. divisjon. The second last teams in group A and B met in a two-legged qualification round to avoid relegation.

Mjøndalen won group A with 29 points. Rosenborg won group B with 27 points. Both teams promoted to the 1979 1. divisjon. Tromsø won group C and qualified for and the promotion play-offs but was not promoted.

Tables

Group A

Group B

Group C

Play-offs

Promotion play-offs

Results
Tromsø – HamKam 0–3
Fredrikstad – Tromsø 1–0
HamKam – Fredrikstad 1–1

Play-off table

Relegation play-offs

Results
Os – Strømmen 2–1
Strømmen – Os 0–1

Os won 3–1 on aggregate. Strømmen was relegated to 3. divisjon.

References

Norwegian First Division seasons
1978 in Norwegian football
Norway
Norway